Torso of Adele is an 1878-1884 sculpture by the French artist Auguste Rodin, originally modelled in plaster before being worked in terracotta.

Work
Judith Cladel (Rodin's friend and biographer) states that it arose from his study of caryatids. The model was probably the Italian Adèle Abruzzesi, one of Rodin's favourite models. The sculpture was only completed in 1889 by the addition of the legs and left arm, for use in the top left-hand corner of The Gates of Hell. It does not appear in William Elborne's 1887 photographs of The Gates and so Rodin probably added it later. He also used the same torso, with a head added, for the female figures in Eternal Springtime and Illusions Received by the Earth.

See also
List of sculptures by Auguste Rodin

References

External links

Sculptures by Auguste Rodin
1884 sculptures
Terracotta sculptures
Plaster sculptures